"Tomorrow" is a US-only single released by Morrissey in September 1992. It reached number one on Billboard magazine's Hot Modern Rock Tracks chart. It is a remix of the final track of Morrissey's Your Arsenal album of the same year.

Track listing
CD version (9 40580-2)
"Tomorrow" (Morrissey, Alain Whyte) – 4:17
"Let the Right One Slip In" (Morrissey, Whyte, Gary Day) – 2:26
"Pashernate Love" (Morrissey, Whyte, Day) – 2:22

12" version (0-40580)
"Tomorrow" (Morrissey, Whyte) – 4:17
"Let the Right One Slip In" (Morrissey, Whyte, Day) – 2:26
"There Speaks a True Friend" – 2:19

Charts

See also
List of Billboard Modern Rock Tracks number ones of the 1990s

References

1992 singles
Morrissey songs
Songs written by Morrissey
Songs written by Alain Whyte
1992 songs
Sire Records singles